Unity is an unincorporated community in Scotland County, in the U.S. state of Missouri.

History
A post office called Unity was established in 1857, and remained in operation until 1907. The community most likely was named after nearby Unity Cumberland Presbyterian Church.

References

Unincorporated communities in Scotland County, Missouri
1857 establishments in Missouri
Unincorporated communities in Missouri